Mera Naam Yousuf Hai ("My name is Yousuf"), previously titled as Zulekha Bina Yusuf  ("Yousuf without Zulekha"), is a Pakistani television drama serial, which originally aired on the A-Plus Entertainment from 17 March 2015 till 27 October 2015, comprising a total of 20 episodes. Mera Naam Yousuf Hai follows a Forbidden Love Story of Yousuf and Zulaikha and was loosely based on story "Yusof-o Zulaikhā" (یوسف و زلیخا) by Jami in his book Haft Awrang.

Mera Naam Yousuf Hai stars Maya Ali and Imran Abbas Naqvi as the title characters Zulaikha and Yusuf, respectively, as well as Hina Khawaja Bayat, Waseem Abbas, Behroze Sabzwari, Mizna Waqas and Mansha Pasha in recurring roles. Series was produced by Saadia Jabbar, and aired on A-plus entertainment as part of a night programming of 20:00. It was written by Khalil-Ur-Rehman Qamar and directed by Mehreen Jabbar.

Plot

The story revolves around the forbidden love of Yousuf and Zulaikha. Yousuf first sees Zulaikha on a train and cannot get her out of his mind. Zulaikha, on the other hand, considered it a momentary attraction as she is stuck between her cousin's marriage proposals, masked by the personal interests of her parents. She bumps into Yousuf several times, who is evidently in love with her and expresses his feelings for her. Later, Noor Muhammad, Zulaikha's father, announces her marriage to Imran Moeez (his nephew) so he himself can marry Imran's aunt, Bushra. Yousuf tries to prove his love to Zulaikha so she can deny marrying Imran. The story takes turn when the police torture Yousuf upon Noor Muhammad's orders; at this point, Zulaikha becomes aware that his love for her has always been true. Looking to this, Zulaikha eventually falls in love with Yousuf. Afiya Begum, Zulaikha's mother and Hajira, Zulaikha's sister, then start to support her in marrying Yousuf while Noor Muhammad starts threatening them, he however marries Bushra successfully. 

Yousuf and Zulaikha had conveyed to each other that both are not made for each other and separation is their destiny. Afiya protects her daughters from their father, and survives all his tortures.

Cast

Production

Mera Naam Yousaf Hai (initially titled as Zulekha Bina Yousuf) was developed by producer Sadia Jabbar of Sadia Jabbar Productions, she hired successful director Mehreen Jabbar to direct the series. The Show is written by famous writer Khalil-ur-Rehman Qamar, and is loosely based on the story of Yusuf and Zulaikha by Jami in his book Haft Awrang with some edits, the screenplay is also written by Khalil-ur-Rehman Qamar while Script composing is done by Naman Ali. Approximately with twenty-one episodes, Zulaikha Bina Yousuf was completed in February 2015 and was all set to premier on 12 March 2015 with a prime slot of Thursday 8:00pm. However, in mid-March 2015 production house changed the name of the series to Mera Naam Yousuf Hai and changed its premier to 6 March 2015. Song composition is done by Sultan Athor while the OST given by Saad Sultan. The show aired weekly episode for 35 - 40 (without commercials) minutes every Friday to 18 July 2015.

Producer Sadia Jabbar choose, Imran Abbas Naqvi and Maya Ali to play the leading roles of Yousuf and Zulaikha, respectively.  The actors Mansha Pasha, Waseem Abbas, Behroze Sabzwari, Hina Khawaja Bayat and Seema Seher were selected to portray Madiha, Noor Muhammad, Waji Ahmed, Afiya and Hajira, respectively.

The filming of ‘’Mera Naam Yousaf hai’’ began in November 2014 and was completed on February 2015, under the title Zulaikha Bina Yousuf. With the title of Zulekha Bina Yousuf. It was initially set to release on 12 March 2015  but on 2 March 2015, it was announced that the channel will release it on the 6th of March.

Soundtrack

Broadcast and release 
Mera Naam Yousuf Hai originally broadcast on A-Plus Entertainment from 12 March 2015 to 6 July 2015.

The show was rebroadcast in Pakistan on ATV (Pakistan) by the title Gar Badnaam Huay (گر بدنام ہوۓ).

Star India begin its airing on 19 October 2015 on their channel Star Plus and thus becoming the channel's first ever Pakistani drama. The series was aired in UAE, USA, Ireland, UK, Austria, Europe, Canada and Latin America excluding India. Series received extravagant reception in viewership and ratings. After airing on Star Plus, it was aired on another network of Star India, Life OK. The show was aired from 2 April 2016 to 5 June 2016 and aired on weekends. On Life OK, it was also the first ever Pakistani drama of the channel.

It also aired in India on Zindagi.

Since July 2020, the show is available for online streaming on Indian OTT platform Zee5.

Reception

Critical appreciation
Sadaf Siddiqui of Dawn News states that Mera Naam Yousuf Hai is off to a smooth start in her issue she praised Writer's story line stating Writer Khalil-ur-Rehman Qamar’s pen aspires to the tragic, the epic, and the unusual, and as his previous drama Pyare Afzal has shown, in some cases it succeeds she also praised Mehreen Jabbar as director stating Director Mehreen Jabbar managed to keep Khalil sahib’s flair for drama under her subtle control. She hasn't let the dialogue overpower the narrative. It helps that the drama's production values are excellent as is the visual story telling with hints at the character's inner lives. She lauded Maya Alli, Imran Abbas Naqvi and Hina Khawaja Bayat's role by saying Maya Ali’s restrained performance as Zulekha proves she's a director’s actor and so far Mehreen Jabbar has guided her well. Imran Abbas, who seems perennially youthful, also, pardon the pun, strikes a chord as the dreamer Yousuf. But if there was an actor who stole the spotlight today, it has to be Hina Khwaja Bayat.

Siddiqui, on her other issue  praised the shows plot and melodrama stating "TV drama Mera Naam Yousuf Hai plays the filmi card and wins". She further added that "It isn't merely filmi in the sense that it features over-the-top melodrama; there are also a fair number of larger-than-life events to contend with. These events aren't just plot points pushing the story forward, they're like cogs in a vast machine that represent the characters' interconnected, messy lives." She commented on Khalil-Ur-Rehman Qamar's screenplay stating that "Khalil sahib's script brings into question society’s hypocrisies and double standards, as well as the different roles, expectations and allowances for men and women." She also praised Mehreen Jabbar's directory saying "It is quite commendable that despite all these filmi touches and a tendency to go over the top, Mehreen Jabbar's directorial hand is very much in control." In an issue of Dawn 6 April 2015, Sadaf Siddiqui  stated that "Mera Naam Yousuf Hai is a One sided Love story so far" she comments not the plot stating "What does one do when one’s own parents are engaged in a game of one-upmanship, placing one’s freedom and right to choose in jeopardy?". For the current episode arc Sadaf once again praised Qamar's classic storyline stating "Khalilur Rehman Qamar’s writing sparkles with wit and clearly unke kamaan pe bahut se teer hai. The way the story and each of the characters is revealed adds something new to the plot progression and builds on each characters back stories."

On 29 July 2015, Sadaf Siddui's praised the show's screenplay and storyline commenting "Do class concerns trump love? Mera Naam Yousuf Hai asks big questions". In her article she said that "Writer creates chemistry and romantic tension between the leads despite them not sharing much screen time. It is sheer mastery that makes allowance for conservatism and added that he carefully tends to family relationships and friendships." After summing up the entire show and story line, Siddiqui said that "The drama makes important observations about power: in our patriarchal society and its lopsided and unfair ways, people use power to perpetuate their own interests and maintain the status quo." She also praised the series conclusion where she added that "The biggest surprise perhaps was that Khalil sahib allowed the lovers to reunite, however not without a near death experience". It is the only drama to air on the famous Indian channel Star Plus.

See also
 Tum Kon Piya
 Sadqay Tumhare
 Yusuf and Zulaikha
 Zulekha
 Yusuf

References

External links
 official website
 

A-Plus TV original programming
2015 Pakistani television series debuts
2014 Pakistani television series endings
Pakistani drama television series
Urdu-language telenovelas
Pakistani telenovelas
Mehreen Jabbar's directions